The 1st FotoFilm Tijuana Festival took place from 14 to 17 July 2017, in Tijuana, Baja California, Mexico. As stated by its CEO, Julio Rodríguez, the first edition of the festival, held at the Tijuana Cultural Center, had 30 different activities, 41 speakers, 180 featured artists, and 22,000 attendees. The official selection for short films was divided in two fields: "Desde el Norte" ("From the North") including four short films by Mexican directors based on Baja California; and "Jukebox Visual", for short films sent through an open call for filmmakers posted on the FilmFreeway website. The feature films included in the main program were selected by the festival film programmer.

Official selection

Feature films
The selection included two feature films, William: El Nuevo Maestro del Judo and Heroyna; and the anthology film La Habitación.

Short films

Desde el Norte
The selection for "Desde el Norte" ("From the North") included four short films directed by Mexican filmmakers based on the Baja California state. Hambre, directed by Alejandro Montalvo, won the Audience Award.

References

2017 film festivals
Culture in Tijuana
July 2017 events in Mexico
Events in Baja California